Lesbian, gay, bisexual and transgender  (LGBT) people in the People's Republic of China face legal and social challenges that are not experienced by non-LGBT residents. Same-sex couples are unable to marry or adopt, and households headed by such couples are ineligible for the same legal protections available to heterosexual couples. China provides no anti-discrimination protections for LGBT people, nor does it prohibit hate crimes based on sexual orientation or gender identity.

Homosexuality and homoeroticism in China have been documented since ancient times. According to certain studies by Dr. Bret Hinsch, now associated with Fo Guang University in Taiwan, reviewed in a journal published by the University of London, homosexuality was regarded as a normal facet of life in China, prior to Western influence from 1840 onwards. Several early Chinese emperors are speculated to have had homosexual relationships accompanied by heterosexual ones. Opposition to homosexuality, according to these same studies, did not become firmly established in China until the 19th and 20th centuries, through the Westernization efforts of the late Qing dynasty and the early Chinese Republic. However, this can be disputed since as early as 1655, Qing courts began to refer to the term ji jian (雞姦, sodomy) to apply to homosexual anal intercourse. Society began to emphasise strict obedience to the social order, which referred to a relationship between husband and wife. In 1740, an anti-homosexual decree was promulgated, defining voluntarily homosexual intercourse between adults as illegal. Though there were no records on the effectiveness of this decree, it was the first time homosexuality had been subject to legal proscription in China. The punishment included a month in prison and 80 heavy blows with heavy bamboo.

Homosexuality was largely invisible during the Mao era. In the 1980s, the subject of homosexuality reemerged in the public domain and gay identities and communities have expanded in the public eye since then. However, the studies note that public discourse in China appears uninterested and, at best, ambivalent about homosexuality, and traditional sentiments on family obligations and discrimination remains a significant factor deterring same-sex attracted people from coming out.

The government's approach to LGBT rights has been described as "fickle" and as being "no approval; no disapproval; no promotion". There is much resistance from the authorities, as various LGBT events have been banned in recent years. In present years, China has banned showing homosexual relationships on public television, as well as showing effeminate men in general.

History and timeline

Ancient China

Shang dynasty
The earliest records of homosexuality and same-sex relations in China date from the Shang dynasty era ( 16th to 11th century BCE). The term luan feng was used to describe homosexuality. No records of lesbian relations exist, however. In this time, homosexuality was largely viewed with indifference and usually treated with openness.

Zhou dynasty
Several stories of homosexual love during the Zhou dynasty ( 1046–256 BCE) are well known, even to this day. One such story refers to Duke Xian of Jin (reigned 676–651 BCE) planting a handsome young man in a rival's court in order to influence the other ruler with the young man's sexual charm and to give him bad advice. A more exalted example would be the relationship of Mi Zixia (彌子瑕) and Duke Ling of Wei (衛靈公). Mizi Xia's sharing of an especially delicious peach with his lover was referenced by later writers as yútáo, or "the leftover peach". Another example of homosexuality at the highest level of society from the Warring States period is the story of King Anxi of Wei and his lover Lord Long Yang.

Homosexuality was widely referenced during this period through popular literature. Poet Qu Yuan is said to have expressed his love for the ruling monarch, King Huai of Chu, through several of this works, most notably "Li Sao" and "Longing for Beauty".

Imperial China

Han dynasty

Homosexuality and homoeroticism were common and accepted during the Han dynasty (202 BCE - 220 CE). Emperor Ai of Han is one of the most famous Chinese emperors to have engaged in same-sex sexual activity. Historians characterize the relationship between Emperor Ai and his male lover Dong Xian as "the passion of the cut sleeve" (斷袖之癖, duànxiù zhī pì) after a story that one afternoon after falling asleep for a nap on the same bed, Emperor Ai cut off Dong Xian's sleeve (in a piece of clothing they were sharing) rather than disturb him when he had to get out of bed. Dong was noted for his relative simplicity contrasted with the highly ornamented court, and was given progressively higher and higher posts as part of the relationship, eventually becoming the supreme commander of the armed forces by the time of Emperor Ai's death.

It was also during this period that one of the first mentions of female homosexuality surfaced. A historian in the Eastern Han dynasty, Ying Shao, made observations regarding several Imperial Palace women forming homosexual attachments with one another, in a relationship titled duishi (a term interpreted to refer to reciprocal cunnilingus), in which the two acted as a married couple.

Liu Song dynasty
Writings from the Liu Song dynasty era (420–479 CE) claim that homosexuality was as common as heterosexuality. It is said that men engaged so often in homosexual activity, that unmarried women became jealous.

Tang dynasty
During the Tang dynasty (618–907 CE) era, there were traditions of pederastic same-sex relationships, typically in Buddhist temples, among a young boy and an adult man. Lesbian relationships also commonly occurred in Buddhist nunneries, as many Buddhist nuns sought relationships with one another. Taoist nuns meanwhile were recorded as having exchanged many upon many love poems to one another.

Song dynasty
The earliest law against homosexual prostitution in China dates from the Zhenghe era (政和, 1111–1118) of Emperor Zhao Ji (趙佶) in the Song dynasty (960–1279), punishing nánchāng, young males who act as prostitutes, with a punishment of 100 blows with heavy bamboo and a fine of 50,000 cash. Another text from the Song dynasty prohibits the offense of bu nan (crossdressing). They were never enforced.

Ming dynasty
In addition to having relationships with men, the Zhengde Emperor also had many relationships with women. He sought the daughters of many of his officials. The Tianqi Emperor is believed to have had two private palaces, one for his female lovers and one for his male lovers. During this era, lesbian sexual practices became meeting the rapidly rising trend of "sapphism", which were created all in the name of pleasure. This included, but was not limited to the acts of frottage, cunnilingus and mutual masturbation.

Chinese homosexuals did not experience persecution which would compare to that experienced by homosexuals in Christian Europe during the Middle Ages, and in some areas, particularly among the merchant classes, same-sex love was particularly appreciated. There was a stereotype in the late Ming dynasty that the province of Fujian was the only place where homosexuality was prominent, but Xie Zhaozhe (1567–1624) wrote that "from Jiangnan and Zhejiang to Beijing and Shanxi, there is none that does not know of this fondness." European Jesuit missionaries such as Matteo Ricci took note of what they deemed "unnatural perversions", distressed over its often open and public nature. Historian Timothy Brook writes that abhorrence of sexual norms went both ways, since "the celibate Jesuits were rich food for sexual speculation among the Chinese." Chinese writers typically made fun of these men, insisting that the only reason they condemned homosexuality was because they were forced to refrain from sexual pleasure as they were celibate.

The first statute specifically prohibiting same-sex sexual intercourse was enacted in the Jiajing era (嘉靖, 1522–1567) of Emperor Zhu Houcong (朱厚熜) in 1546. Despite this, homosexuality was still commonly accepted and practiced, providing that the men produced heirs and married women later on. Homosexuality was even viewed as "luxurious" by middle classes. Same-sex marriage ceremonies were commonplace.

Qing dynasty

By 1655, Qing courts began to refer to the term ji jian (sodomy) to apply to homosexual anal intercourse. Society began to emphasise strict obedience to the social order, which referred to a relationship between husband and wife. In 1740, an anti-homosexual decree was promulgated, defining voluntarily homosexual intercourse between adults as illegal. Though there were no records on the effectiveness of this decree, it was the first time homosexuality had been subject to legal proscription in China. The punishment, which included a month in prison and 100 heavy blows with heavy bamboo, was actually the lightest punishment which existed in the Qing legal system.

Modern China

Republic of China
In 1912, the Xinhai Revolution toppled the Qing dynasty and its explicit prohibition of ji jian was abolished by the succeeding states.

Heteronormativity and intolerance of gays and lesbians became more mainstream through the Westernization efforts of the early Republic of China.

People's Republic of China
Homosexuality was largely invisible during the Mao era. During the Communist Cultural Revolution (1966 to 1976), homosexuals were regarded as "disgraceful" and "undesirable", and heavily persecuted.

All mentions to homosexuality in criminal law were removed in 1997. The Chinese Society of Psychiatry declassified homosexuality as a mental disorder in 2001 but still claims that a person could be conflicted or suffering from mental problems due to their sexuality. However, such change is yet to be reflected by the regulations of National Health and Family Planning Commission, a government branch that controls all regulations of health care services in China, which has resulted in psychiatric facilities and psychiatry education textbooks across the country still de facto considering homosexuality as a mental disorder and continuing to offer conversion therapy treatments. Transgender identity is still classified as a disorder despite laws allowing legal gender changes. In 2021, a court in Jiangsu upheld a ruling that a description of homosexuality as a mental disorder in a 2013 edition of a university textbook was a result of "perceptual differences", rather than factual error. According to the South China Morning Post, the textbook is used by a number of Chinese universities. In July 2021, a number of LGBT accounts run by university students on WeChat were deleted, with messages saying that the accounts "had violated regulations on the management of accounts offering public information service on the Chinese internet".Chinese gay community are still facing the social and professional pressures while no laws expressly provided protection against these discrimination. 2016 UNDP survey indicated that less than five percent of LGBT people are fully out at school, work, or in their religious community, while about fifteen percent are out to their families.

Recognition of same-sex relationships

The Marriage Law of the People's Republic of China (pinyin: Zhōnghuá Rénmín Gònghéguó Hūnyīn Fǎ), adopted at the third session of the Fifth National People's Congress on September 10, 1980, defines marriage as a union between a man and a woman.

On 5 January 2016, a court in Changsha, southern Hunan Province, agreed to hear a lawsuit filed in December 2015 against the Bureau of Civil Affairs of Furong District. This litigation was believed as the first case of gay marriage right in mainland China. The lawsuit was filed by 26-year-old Sun Wenlin, who in June 2015 had been refused permission by the bureau to marry his 36-year-old partner, Hu Mingliang. On 13 April 2016, with hundreds of same-sex marriage supporters outside, the Changsha court ruled against Sun, who said he would appeal. On 17 May 2016, Sun and Hu were married in a private ceremony in Changsha, expressing their intention to organize another 99 same-sex weddings across the country in order to normalize same-sex marriage in China.

In October 2017, the National People's Congress amended Chinese law so that "all adults of full capacity are given the liberty of appointing their own guardians by mutual agreement." The system, variously called "legal guardianship" or "guardianship agreement", permits same-sex partners to make important decisions about medical and personal care, death and funeral, property management, and maintenance of rights and interests. In case one partner loses the ability to make crucial decisions (i.e. mental or physical illness or accident), their guardian may decide for them in their best interest. Their legal relationship can also include wealth and inheritance, or pension, depending on which additional legal documents the couple decides to sign, such as a will.

On 12 April 2021, the Shenyang Intermediate People's Court in Liaoning province ruled that a 79-year-old woman could not sue her female partner of 50 years, whom she accused of stealing 294,000 yuan from her bank account, because their relationship is not recognized as a marriage in China.

Beijing
Beijing currently provides dependent residency status to the same-sex partners of legal residents, such as expats.

Hong Kong

In June 2009, the Government of Hong Kong extended limited recognition and protection to cohabitating same-sex couples in its Domestic Violence Ordinance (pinyin: Jiātíng Jí Tóngjū Guānxi Bàolì Tiáolì).

In April and September 2017, Hong Kong courts ruled that the same-sex partners of government employees must receive the same spousal benefits as opposite-sex partners and that the same-sex partners of Hong Kong residents have the right to live in the territory as dependents, respectively. These two rulings were both appealed by the Hong Kong Government. In July 2018, the Court of Final Appeal upheld the September ruling, stating that same-sex partners have the right to receive dependent visas, and as such can legally reside in Hong Kong. Likewise, on 6 June 2019, the Court of Final Appeal upheld the April ruling, after it had initially been overturned by the Court of Appeal.

In June 2018, a Hong Kong lesbian woman known as "MK" filed a lawsuit against the Hong Kong Government for denying her the right to enter into a civil partnership with her female partner, arguing that her rights to privacy and equality had been violated, amounting to a breach of the Hong Kong Basic Law and the Hong Kong Bill of Rights Ordinance. The High Court heard the case in a brief 30-minute preliminary hearing in August 2018. A full hearing took place on 28 May 2019, but the court dismissed the case in October 2019.

In November 2018, openly gay legislator Raymond Chan Chi-chuen proposed a motion to study civil unions for same-sex couples, but this was voted down by 27 to 24.

In January 2019, two men launched legal challenges against Hong Kong's same-sex marriage ban, arguing that the refusal to recognize and perform same-sex marriages is a violation of the Basic Law. The Hong Kong High Court has given permission for the cases to proceed.

Adoption and parenting
The Chinese Government requires parents adopting children from China to be in heterosexual marriages. Adoption of Chinese children by foreign same-sex couples and homosexual individuals is prohibited by the Chinese authorities.

Discrimination protections
Article 33 of the Constitution of the People's Republic of China provides for equality for all citizens under the law. This is no explicit mention of sexual orientation or gender identity.

There is no anti-discrimination provision for sexual orientation or gender identity under Chinese labour law. Labour law specifically protects workers against discrimination on the basis of a person's ethnicity, gender or religion.

In 2018, a gay kindergarten teacher from Qingdao sued his former school after he was dismissed from his job, following a social media post he had made about attending an LGBT event. The kindergarten was sentenced by the Laoshan District People's Court to compensate the teacher for six months of payable wages. It filed an appeal in December of the same year.

In November 2018 and March 2019, China accepted several recommendations pertaining to LGBT rights during its Universal Periodic Review. The "landmark" recommendations, from Argentina, Chile, France, Ireland, Mexico, the Netherlands and Sweden, urge China to pass an anti-discrimination law covering sexual orientation and enact anti-violence and social security measures. For the first time, the Chinese delegation responded positively. In March 2019, it was revealed at the UN that China aims to adopt an LGBT anti-discrimination law within a year. Activists described the recommendations as a "milestone".

Hong Kong

The Hong Kong Bill of Rights Ordinance 1991 (pinyin: Xiānggǎng Rénquán Fǎ'àn Tiáolì) was utilized to struck down discrimination in the age of consent in the case of Leung TC William Roy v. Secretary for Justice (2005). However this does not protect against governmental discrimination in services and goods.

Macau
Article 25 of the Basic Law of Macau indicates the people of Macau are free from discrimination based on a non-exhaustive list of prohibited factors. Sexual orientation is not included in said list of prohibited discrimination grounds. However, there are anti-discrimination protections based on sexual orientation in the fields of labour relations (article 6/2 of the  Law No. 7/2008), protection of personal data (article 7/1,2 of Law No. 8/2005), and ombudsman (article 31-A of Law No. 4/2012).

Transgender rights

Gender reassignment on official identification documents (Resident Identity Card and Hukou) is allowed in China only after sex reassignment surgery. Meanwhile, discrimination from the society towards transgender people is common.

In 2009, the Chinese Government made it illegal for minors to change their officially-listed gender, stating that sex reassignment surgery, available to only those over the age of twenty, was required in order to apply for a revision of their identification card and residence registration. According to The Economist, those seeking a legal gender change are also required to be unmarried, be heterosexual (with regards to their gender identity), and must obtain permission from their family. As of September 2019, the Chinese Classification of Mental Disorders still classified transgender identity as a mental disorder.

In 2014, Shanxi Province started allowing minors to apply for the change with the additional information of their guardian's identification card. This shift in policy allows post-surgery marriages to be recognized as heterosexual and therefore legal.

In 2020, a court in Beijing said that a transgender woman was covered by anti-discrimination protections pertaining to sex, and her employer was obligated to treat her as female, because she had legally transitioned.

In 2021, China's first clinic for transgender children and adolescents was set up at the Children's Hospital of Fudan University in Shanghai to safely and healthily manage transgender minors' transition.

According to a survey conducted by Peking University, Chinese trans female students face strong discrimination in many areas of education. Sex segregation is found everywhere in Chinese schools and universities: student enrollment (for some special schools, universities and majors), appearance standards (hairstyles and uniforms included), private spaces (bathrooms, toilets and dormitories included), physical examinations, military trainings, conscription, PE classes and exams and physical health tests. Chinese students are required to attend all the activities according to their legal gender marker. It is also difficult to change the gender information of educational attainments and academic degrees in China, even after sex reassignment surgery, which results in discrimination against well-educated trans women.

In China, trans women are required to receive approval from their entire family, prove they have no criminal record, and undergo psychological intervention in order to be allowed a prescription for hormone medication. Familial disapproval had led many to seek alternative sources of their medication, including online sources, until late 2022 when Chinese authorities put forth a draft policy to ban the practice of selling estradiol medication and androgen blockers online.

Hong Kong
Hong Kong law allows change in legal documents such as the identity cards and passports after a person has undergone sex reassignment surgery, but does not allow birth certificates to be changed.

Intersex rights

Intersex rights are very limited in China. Issues include both the lack of access to health care for intersex people and coercive genital surgeries for intersex children.

Freedom of expression and censorship

In 2015, film-maker Fan Popo sued government censors for pulling his gay documentary Mama Rainbow from online sites. The lawsuit concluded in December 2015 with a finding by the Beijing No.1 Intermediate People's Court that the State Administration of Press, Publication, Radio, Film and Television (SAPPRFT) had not requested that hosting sites pull the documentary. Despite this ruling, which Fan felt was a victory because it effectively limited state involvement, "the film is still unavailable to see online on Chinese hosting sites."

On 31 December 2015, the China Television Drama Production Industry Association posted new guidelines, including a ban on showing LGBT relationships on television. The regulations stated: "No television drama shall show abnormal sexual relationships and behaviors, such as incest, same-sex relationships, sexual perversion, sexual assault, sexual abuse, sexual violence, and so on." These new regulations have begun to affect web dramas, which have historically had fewer restrictions:

Chinese Web dramas are commonly deemed as enjoying looser censorship compared with content on TV and the silver screen. They often feature more sexual, violent and other content that is deemed by traditional broadcasters to fall in the no-no area.

In February 2016, the popular Chinese gay web series Addicted (Heroin) was banned from being broadcast online 12 episodes into a 15-episode season. Makers of the series uploaded the remaining episodes on YouTube instead.

On March 2, 2017, the judgement of the "First Case of Chinese Gay Educational Right " was pronounced in the Beijing Higher People's Court. The plaintiff, Qiu Bai (pseudonym), a senior student at Sun Yat-Sen University in Guangzhou, lost the lawsuit.

On the beginning of 2016, Qiu Bai sent a letter to the Ministry of Education of the People's Republic of China, hoping that it would take measures in order to stop the use homophobic  teaching materials in colleges and universities, this letter was received by the Ministry on February 2016. However, no offical reply has been received from the Ministry. On April 25th, 2016, Qiubai sued the Ministry of Education for inaction based on the relevant provisions of the Chinese Administrative Litigation Law , but the court refused to file the case. In May, she decided to file an administrative reconsideration with the Ministry of Education, which was not accepted. On June 14, she sued the Ministry of Education before the court, and the case was successfully filed.  On September 27, the Court issued a decision by ruling that Qiubai's right as a lesbian is "an unspecific rights that all student or member of the gay community enjoy". Thus her allegation that her specific rights was hindered was not founded. She then decided to file an appeal. The hearing for the second instance at the Beijing Municipal High People's Court was scheduled at January 10, 2017 . Qiubai's attorney Yu Liying stated that she provided new evidence and a more detailed explanation of the infringement suffered by Qiubai, but the Ministry of Education did not recognize the relevance of the evidence with the case. On March 2 2017, the High Court of Beijing made a final judgment, announcing that Qiubai lost the case and rejected her appeal based on the similar ground as the first instance. Thus, she was not managed to win any of her case among the five litigations she was involved in before the court. During her legal fight, she was constantly under the pressure from the university administration. This final judgement means that for a long time to come, in the various textbooks used by Chinese university students, homosexuality may continue to be described as "disease", "mental disorder" and "abnormality".

In 2017, an LGBT conference was scheduled to be held in Xi'an. Western reports, using the organisers blog as their source, claimed the police had detained the organisers and threatened them.

In July 2021, the WeChat accounts of the several LGBT associations from Chinese universities were closed. The accounts that were closed include some of the most important and influential university associations including: Purple from Tsinghua, Colorsworld from Peking University, Zhihe from Fudan University etc. The spokesperson of the Ministry of Foreign Affairs of the People's Republic of China, Wang Wenbin, responded to this by stating that he was not aware of situation, and claimed that "the Chinese government manages the Internet according to law."

In April 2018, Sina Weibo, one of the most popular social media platforms in China, decided to ban all LGBT-related issues. This quickly drew criticism from the public at large and the People's Daily, the Chinese Communist Party's official newspaper. Forms of criticism included the hashtag #IamGay, which was viewed over 240 million times. Sina Weibo reversed its ban a few days later. Many Chinese interpreted the People's Daily editorial as a signal that the government may soften its attitude towards LGBT rights. However, a campaign marking the International Day Against Homophobia on school campuses was forbidden by public officials just one month later. Siodhbhra Parkin, a fellow at the Global Network for Public Interest Law, said the public should not overinterpret the newspaper's decision: "It might be a signal showing that the government does not have a problem with LGBT rights as a concept. However, that doesn't mean that the authorities will tolerate civil mobilization and activism. I don't think you're going to see the Chinese government supporting civil society groups at the same time that they are trying to crack down [on] all these other groups. When you're an LGBT NGO, you're still an NGO. And that is always going to be kind of the determining factor for whether or not the LGBT movement moves forward."

In May 2018, the European Broadcasting Union blocked Mango TV, one of China's most watched channels, from airing the final of the Eurovision Song Contest 2018 after it edited out Irish singer Ryan O'Shaughnessy's performance, which depicted two male dancers, and blacked out rainbow flags during Switzerland's performance.

Days before the International Day Against Homophobia in 2018, two women wearing rainbow badges were attacked and beaten by security guards in Beijing. The security company dismissed the three guards involved shortly thereafter.

Mr Gay China, a beauty pageant, was held in 2016 without incident. In 2018, the event host passively cancelled their engagement by not responding to any communications. Mr Gay World 2019 announced cancellation after communication began to deteriorate in early August. No official censorship notice was issued but some articles blamed the Chinese Government for the cancellation. That same year, a woman who wrote a gay-themed novel was sentenced to 10 years and 6 months in prison for "breaking obscenity laws".

Amid increasing criticism of China's tightening of censorship under the rule of Chinese leader Xi Jinping, the Beijing International Film Festival attracted controversy when in 2018, China's government censors banned the festival from screening the Oscar-winning Call Me by Your Name, throwing a spotlight on LGBT rights in China.

In 2020, Shanghai Pride Festival, one of the most important gay rights festivals founded in 2009, were forced to cancel their activities without mentioning the reason.

In 2021, Li Ying (footballer, born 1993) became the first openly Lesbian athlete, posting on her Sina Weibo account, a photo of herself and partner. The post garnered resounding support from the internet audience however it was also the subject of significant homophobic abuse. The photo was deleted without explanation. Later in 2021, Sun Wenjing, a Chinese professional volleyball player also announced via social media that she was a Lesbian by posting wedding photos of herself and her partner.

In 2021, PFLAG China (Parents, Families, and Friends of Lesbians and Gays) changed its name to "Trueself", and the goal of the association altered as well: it now connects the work with the governmental statement by claiming that they focus on " make tens of thousands of families an important basis for national development, national progress, and social harmony ".

In February 2022 gay dating app Grindr was removed from app stores in China during a censorship push in the lead up to the 2022 Winter Olympics. Though Chinese government allows the existence of various gay dating applications in the Chinese market. In 2000, Baoli Ma founded his own website, Danlan.org, which then become Blued, one of the most important gay dating applications in China. There exist also other similar dating applications including Finka, and Rela.

In February 2022, the first season of the series "Friends" returned to major streaming media in mainland China, but all the same-sex marriage and love plots were deleted, including dialogues that mentioned lesbian people and scenes of same-sex kissing. However, Sohu Video, which was authorized to rebroadcast "Friends" from 2012 to 2018, retained the same-sex marriage plot at the time. The deletion drew widespread criticism, and the related hashtag was immediately banned by Sina Weibo.

Conversion therapy

In December 2014, a Beijing court ruled in favor of Yang Teng, a gay man, in a case against a conversion therapy clinic. The court ruled against the clinic, as the treatments failed to deliver the clinic's promise in its advertisements, and ordered the clinic to pay monetary compensation to Yang, as well as take down their advertisements on conversion therapy treatments.

In June 2016, Yu Hu, a gay man from Henan Province, sued a hospital in the city of Zhumadian for forcing him to undergo conversion therapy. He was awarded a public apology and monetary compensation in July 2017. However, the court did not rule the practice as illegal in its decision.

Following these two successful rulings, LGBT groups are now calling on the Chinese Health Ministry to ban conversion therapy. However, as of December 2019, no effective measures have been taken by the Chinese Government to ban conversion therapy, and such treatments are being actively promoted across China.

Public opinion and demographics

According to certain estimates from 2010, about 80% to 90% of Chinese gay men were married to women. Such women are known as tongqi in Chinese (pinyin: tóngqī). In 2012, a professor at Sichuan University committed suicide after learning that her husband was gay.

A 2016 survey from the Beijing LGBT Center found only 5% of those who identified as LGBT had come out to everyone in their lives.

A September–October 2016 survey by the Varkey Foundation found that 54% of 18–21-year-olds supported same-sex marriage in China.

Opinion polls have showed growing levels of support for LGBT rights and same-sex marriage in China. A 2009 poll found that 30% of Beijing's population supported same-sex marriage, while a 2014 poll found that 74% of Hong Kong residents favoured granting certain rights and benefits to same-sex couples.

A 2017 University of Hong Kong poll found that 50.4% of Hong Kong residents supported same-sex marriage, and nearly 70% supported a law protecting LGBT people from discrimination.

Human rights reports

2017 United States Department of State report
In 2017, the United States Department of State reported the following, concerning the status of LGBT rights in China:
Internet Freedom
 "References to homosexuality and the scientifically accurate words for genitalia were also banned. Writers who cover lesbian, gay, bisexual, transgender, and intersex; gender; and youth health issues expressed concern over how to proceed without being shut down."
Acts of Violence, Discrimination, and Other Abuses Based on Sexual Orientation and Gender Identity
 "No laws criminalize private consensual same-sex activities between adults. Due to societal discrimination and pressure to conform to family expectations, however, most lesbian, gay, bisexual, transgender, and intersex (LGBTI) persons refrained from publicly discussing their sexual orientation or gender identity. Individuals and organizations working on LGBTI issues continued to report discrimination and harassment from authorities similar to that experienced by other organizations that accept funding from overseas.
 Despite reports of domestic violence among LGBTI couples, the regulations on domestic violence and the Family Violence Law do not include same-sex partnerships, giving LGBTI victims of domestic violence less legal recourse than heterosexual victims.
 A court in Henan Province in July ruled that a mental hospital in Zhumadian City owed a gay man named Wu 5000 yuan ($735) in compensation over being forced against his will in 2015 into "conversion therapy". Hospital employees forced Wu to take medicine and injections for 19 days after diagnosing him with a "sexual preference disorder".
 NGOs working on LGBTI issues reported that although public advocacy work became more difficult for them in light of the Foreign NGO Management Law and the Domestic Charity Law, they made some progress in advocating for LGBTI rights through specific antidiscrimination cases. In July a court ruled in favor of a transgender man in his suit against his former employer for wrongful termination.
 Xi’an police detained nine members of the gay advocacy group Speak Out hours before the conference it was hosting was slated to start."

Summary table

See also
 Human rights in China
 LGBT rights in Asia
 LGBT rights in Hong Kong
 LGBT rights in Macau
 Recognition of same-sex unions in China
 Homosexuality in China
 LGBT history in China
 Transgender people in China
 Intersex rights in China

Notes

References

 
Chinese law
Human rights in China
LGBT rights in the People's Republic of China

mt:Drittijiet LGBT fiċ-Ċina